Clear Creek is a stream in  Greene County, Missouri, United States. It is a tributary of the Sac River.

The stream flows to the northwest passing under U.S. Route 160 between Willard and Ash Grove.

Clear Creek was named for the clear water which characterizes this stream.

See also
List of rivers of Missouri

References

Rivers of Greene County, Missouri
Rivers of Missouri